We are the Heat (original: Somos Calentura) is a 2018  Colombian drama film about young men in Colombia who are affected by the drug trade.

The film was written by Diego Vivanco and Steven Grisales and directed by Jorge Navas It stars Duván Arizala, José Luis Paz, Miguel Ángel Micolta, Manuel Riascos and Julio Valencia.

The film was exhibited at the Warsaw International Film Festival and the Havana Festival. Somos Calentura is part of the multi award-winning transmedia project  We Are the Heat,  formerly known as  Mon Amour, created by Steven Grisales and Juan DiazB. The transmedia project was recognized with the Best Digital Cases Award, MIP CUBE & MIP TV, 2012, MIDEM Award, Best Latin American Transmedia Project in Multi- Platform, Rio Content Market Lab, Rio de Janeiro, 2012 and was a finalist in the Pixel Pitch Power to the Pixel Competition, International Film Festival, London, 2012.

In 2015, Jorge Navas was invited to take part in the project as director of the film. That year the film won the FDC Integral production fund.

Synopsis 
In Buenaventura, Colombia lifelong friends Harvey, Freddy, Baby, and  Caleñito are the undisputed kings of hip-hop dance, but when the local drug trade tightens around them, they must decide between the pull of the streets and their dreams.

Cast 

 Duván Arizala es "Harvey"
 Miguel Ángel Micolta es "Steven"
 José Luis Paz es "Freddy"
 Manuel Riascos es "El Baby"
 Julio Valencia es "Rebook"
 Heidy Mina es "Lindsay"

References

External links 

 

2018 films
Colombian drama films
2010s Spanish-language films
2018 drama films
2010s Colombian films
Films set in Colombia